Sulfur trioxide pyridine complex is the compound with the formula C5H5NSO3.  It is a colourless solid that dissolves in polar organic solvents.  It is the adduct formed from the Lewis base pyridine and the Lewis acid sulfur trioxide.  The compound is mainly used as a source of sulfur trioxide, for example in the synthesis of sulfate esters from alcohols:
ROH  +  C5H5NSO3   →   [C5H5NH]+[ROSO3]−
It also is useful for sulfamations:
R2NH  +  C5H5NSO3   →   C5H5N   +  R2NSO3H

The compound is used for sulfonylation reactions, especially in the sulfonylation of furans. It is also an activating electrophile in a Parikh-Doering oxidation.

References

Sulfur(VI) compounds
Pyridine complexes
Reagents for organic chemistry